Mike Schmidt (born 23 May 1961) is a German ice hockey player. He competed in the men's tournament at the 1992 Winter Olympics.

References

External links
 

1961 births
Living people
Olympic ice hockey players of Germany
Ice hockey players at the 1992 Winter Olympics
People from Wellington County, Ontario